Roel Braas (born 11 March 1987) is a Dutch rower. He competed in the Men's eight event at the 2012 Summer Olympics. He competed in the Men's coxless pair event at the 2016 Summer Olympics.

References

External links
 

1987 births
Living people
Dutch male rowers
Olympic rowers of the Netherlands
Rowers at the 2012 Summer Olympics
Rowers at the 2016 Summer Olympics
Sportspeople from Alkmaar